Sergio Gadea Panisello (born 30 December 1984 in Puçol, Valencian Community) is a Spanish motorcycle road racer. He started to run professionally in 2003.

Career statistics

Grand Prix motorcycle racing

By season

By year
(Races in bold indicate pole position, races in italics indicate fastest lap of the race)

Superbike World Championship

Races by year

Supersport World Championship

Races by year
(key)

External links

1984 births
Living people
People from Puçol
Sportspeople from the Province of Valencia
Spanish motorcycle racers
125cc World Championship riders
Moto2 World Championship riders
Superbike World Championship riders
Supersport World Championship riders